Star Awards 2015 (also SA2015, Chinese: 红星大奖2015) is a double television award ceremony which is held in Singapore. It is part of the annual Star Awards organised by Mediacorp for free-to-air channel Mediacorp Channel 8. SA2015 is broadcast live on Channel 8, on 19 April 2015 and 26 April 2015.

The ceremony saw The Joy Truck II and The Journey: Tumultuous Times, became the biggest winning variety and drama series respectively.

Programme details

Winners and nominees
Unless otherwise stated, the winners are listed first, highlighted in boldface.

Show 1 (加利谷闪耀星光)
The first show, titled "加利谷闪耀星光" (The Starlight of Caldecott), was broadcast on 19 April 2015.

Professionally Judged Awards 

 Lim was absent during the ceremony due to illness; Kang Lay See represented the award on his behalf.

Awards Eligible for Voting

All Time Favourite Artiste
This award is a special achievement award given out to artiste(s) who have achieved a maximum of 10 popularity awards over 10 years. Top 10 winning years the recipients were awarded together are highlighted in boldface.

Awards Eligible for Voting

Top 10 awards 
Since the 2012 awards, results for the Top 10 Most Popular Male and Female Artistes were determined by telepoll and online voting, each carrying a 50% weightage towards the final results. The telepoll lines were announced, and opened on 9 March 2015 in its first public event held at VivoCity. The voting closed on 26 April at 8:30 pm, during the second award ceremony.

The nominees are listed in telepoll line order. The results of the Top 10 awards are not in any rank order.

Post Show Party Awards (红星大奖2015庆功宴)

Statistics 
Shows are ordered based on number of nominations, release date and type order.

Drama series nominations:

Drama series awards:

Variety / info-ed series nominations:

Variety / info-ed / current affairs series awards:

Current affairs series nominations:

Presenters and performers 
The following individuals presented awards or performed musical numbers.

Show 1

Show 2

Ceremony information

Award Information
This was the last Star Awards ceremony to be held in the Caldecott Hill before the show moved to the new campus in Mediapolis@one-north. As such, the Chinese subtitles for both ceremonies referenced Caldecott (加利谷).
It was also the first Star Awards ceremony since 2009 the ceremony was not held on a location outside  Mediacorp studios. 
As of the most recent ceremony in 2021, this was the last time Professional & Technical Awards were presented on one show in a two-show format (not counting preludes in 2017). Although the following year's ceremony was also a two-show, the two-show format was revamped to focus on the variety and drama categories, while Professional & Technical Awards were awarded outside the show, for the first time since 2009.
It was also the last Star Awards ceremony to feature long-time announcer John Kuek due to his retirement.

Consecutive and records in award categories, first in Top 10
The Joy Truck became the third variety program to win its second Best Variety Programme award, after City Beat and Say It If You Dare.
Rui En became the seventh All-Time Favourite Artiste to win the award with ten consecutive Top 10 Female Favourite Artiste wins. Rui En, along with Qi Yuwu, were conferred the said award in the following year's ceremony.
The previous recipients to do so were Fann Wong and Xie Shaoguang, both occurring in the 2005 ceremony.
Jeanette Aw set a record on winning the most awards for an individual at seven, among which were Most Popular Regional Artiste Awards (three, for Malaysia, Indonesia and Cambodia), Social Media Award, Favourite Female Character, Favourite Onscreen Couple (Drama) (with Zhang Zhenhuan, who they also won all the Favourite category awards) and All-Time Favourite Artiste (with Vivian Lai). 
Carrie Wong, Jayley Woo, Shane Pow and Youyi) were nominated for the Top 10 voting category for the first time.
Pow and Wong, along with Shaun Chen, Ian Fang and Julie Tan, won their first Top 10 Favourite Artiste award.
The last time Felicia Chin nominated (and won) for the Top 10 Most Favourite Female Artiste was 2010; she switched to part-time acting to study for a Bachelor of Business Administration degree in the NUS Business School, quit her studies and has since returned to acting.
The Best Drama Serial nomination for the third season of C.L.I.F. now tied The Unbeatables for its most nominations for its category at three. With the loss to The Journey: Tumultuous Times (which became the eighth drama to receive a second nomination), C.L.I.F. now holds the record for the most nominations without a win.
Star Awards won its fifth consecutive "Best Variety Special" award, part of the five-win streak since the show won her first award in 2010 until its next loss in 2016.

Awards categories 
This was the first show to introduce the category for Tokyo Bust Express Sexy Babe Award.

Controversies 
Professional and programme awards will only be given out when there are at least 10 candidates from 2014 onwards. Even though Channel 8 News & Current Affairs already had ten news presenters by the end of 2014, both the Best News Presenter award and Best Current Affairs Presenter award did not return for a second consecutive year, while the Best Newcomer returned after being absent last year.
The Best Newcomer will be absent again in 2016 and 2017, but returned in 2018.
After Jeanette Aw won six voting-based awards in Show 1, she expressed her intention to withdraw from voting-based award categories in the future. Speaking to the media after the ceremony, Aw said that the move is due to her concern about rabid fans who left messages online saying that this could impede other potential contenders if she did not win enough awards. However, it can be seen that voting for Star Awards 2016 Favourite Female Character for The Journey: Our Homeland and The Dream Makers II did not remove her from the voting list.  Mediacorp quotes that these awards are determined by online voting, and she still had to participate in both categories. Aw would go on to win the Favourite Female Character and Favourite Onscreen Couple (Drama) with Qi Yuwu for The Dream Makers II in the following year, which was the last time the Favourite categories were held.

Other trivia 
Jack Neo's comeback appearance as Liang Po Po in nearly 15 years.

Star Awards 2016 nominations
The 2015 ceremony was nominated for Best Variety Producer and Best Variety Special in the ceremony next year, but were lost to Love on the Plate 3 and GeTai Challenge, respectively; for the latter, the loss ended a five-win streak of winning the "Best Variety Special" since Star Awards 2010.

See also 
 List of programmes broadcast by  Mediacorp Channel 8
 Mediacorp Channel 8
 Star Awards

References 

Star Awards